Abu Ishaq Ibrahim ibn Muhammad al-Farisi al-Istakhri (also Estakhri, i.e. from the Iranian city of Istakhr, b. - d. 346 AH/AD 957) was a 10th-century travel-author and geographer who wrote valuable accounts in Arabic of the many Muslim territories he visited during the Abbasid era of the Islamic Golden Age. There is no consensus regarding his origin. Some sources describe him as Persian, while others state he was Arab. The Encyclopedia Iranica states: "Biographical data are very meager. From his nesbas (attributive names) he appears to have been a native of Eṣṭaḵr in Fārs, but it is not known whether he was Persian".

Istakhri's account of windmills is the earliest known. Istakhri met the celebrated traveller-geographer Ibn Hawqal, while travelling, and Ibn Hawqal incorporated the work of Istakhri in his book Kitab al-Surat al-Ard.

Works
Istakhri's two surviving works are:

Masālik al-Mamālik ("Routes of the Realms") or kitab al-masalik wa-l-mamalik (كتاب المسالك والممالك "Book of roads and kingdoms") This combines maps with descriptive text to describe the geography of Iran and surrounding kingdoms. It is based mainly on lists of stations of postal routes, and seems intended to help commit those lists to memory rather than to guide travellers through the territory. There is no consistency between the map projections. An illuminated manuscript dated 706 AH (1306-07 AD) now resides in the Khalili Collection of Islamic Art. It contains many maps, though some mentioned in the text are missing.
Ṣuwar al-ʿAqālīm ("Pictures of the Regions")

Published Editions

An 8-volume edition of works by medieval Arab geographers, edited by the Dutch orientalist Michael Jan de Goeje in a series titled Bibliotheca geographorum Arabicorum was published by Brill, Lugduni-Batavora (Leiden) in the 1870s.  An edition of Istakhri's MS text was produced for the first volume under the Latin title Viae Regnorum descriptio ditionis Moslemicae - "Description of Roads of the Kingdoms in Muslim territories". In 1927 the editor Theodore Noldeke produced a second edition.

In 1845 the German orientalist A. D. Mordtmann published a translation in Hamburg with the title Das Buch der Länder von Schech Ebu Ishak el Farsi el Isztachri, with a foreword by C. Ritter. (Schriften der Akademie von Ham Bd. 1, Abth. 2).

See also
Ibn Hawqal
Al-Maqdisi
Ibn al-Faqih
Qudama ibn Ja'far
Ibn Khordadbeh
Ibn Rustah
Al-Ya'qubi
Al-Masudi
List of Iranian scientists

References

Sources
 
 

 -

External links
 
 World Map of al-Istakhri 

950s deaths
Year of birth unknown
Year of death uncertain
10th-century Iranian writers
Balkhi school
Istakhr
10th-century Iranian geographers
People associated with wind power
Scholars under the Buyid dynasty
Travel writers of the medieval Islamic world